Margarita María Cedeño Lizardo, formerly known as Margarita Cedeño de Fernández, is a Dominican politician who served as Vice President of the Dominican Republic from 2012 to 2020. She was married to former president, Leonel Fernández and served as the First Lady of the Dominican Republic from 2004 to 2012.

Early and personal life
Cedeño was born on 1 May 1965 in Santo Domingo to Luis Emilio Cedeño Matos and Angela Margarita Lizardo Olivares. She worked with local law firms in the Dominican Republic, among which the law firm of Doctor Abel Rodríguez del Orbe and Fernández y Asociados, where she is an associate member. During the years 1996–2000, she assisted as legal counselor to the President nominated as Sub-secretary of State. Besides being ad honorem counselor and director of the Legal and Investment Environment Management of the Office for the Promotion of Foreign Investment of the Dominican Republic.

She has a Bachelors in Law from the Autonomous University of Santo Domingo and a Masters in Economic Legislation from the Pontificia Universidad Católica Madre y Maestra. She also has participated in courses and seminars at Georgetown and Harvard University in the United States and Geneva University in Switzerland.

On 16 October 2009, Margarita Cedeño de Fernández was named Goodwill Ambassador of the Food and Agriculture Organization of the United Nations (FAO).

Political career
When she was the First Lady (2004–2012), she and her staff coordinated social policies for her husband's administration, generating programs of health and education for children, young people, single mothers and families, in general, as a key element in society.

2012 presidential election
On April 10, 2011 in a meeting of the Central Committee (Comité Central) of the Dominican Liberation Party, she registered her pre-candidature for the 2012 presidential elections. She was elected Vice President to Danilo Medina on 20 May 2012. She became the second woman to serve as vice president after Milagros Ortiz Bosch was elected under former President Hipólito Mejía in 2000–2004.

See also
Luis Abinader
Leonel Fernández
Danilo Medina
Luis Almagro
Adriano Espaillat
Geovanny Vicente
Tom Pérez
Faride Raful
José Ignacio Paliza

Notes

References

External links
 
 
  French biography

1965 births
21st-century Dominican Republic women politicians
21st-century Dominican Republic politicians
Dominican Liberation Party politicians
20th-century Dominican Republic lawyers
Dominican Republic philanthropists
Dominican Republic women lawyers
FAO Goodwill ambassadors
First ladies of the Dominican Republic
Living people
People from Santo Domingo
Pontificia Universidad Católica Madre y Maestra alumni
Universidad Autónoma de Santo Domingo alumni
University of Salamanca alumni
Vice presidents of the Dominican Republic
Women vice presidents
20th-century women lawyers